Stefan Dörflinger (born 23 December 1948 in Nagold, Germany) is a Swiss former Grand Prix motorcycle road racer.

Dörflinger won four consecutive FIM road racing world championships. In 1982 and 1983, he was the 50 cc world champion. In 1984, the FIM increased the displacement capacity to 80 cc and Dörflinger would become the first ever 80 cc world champion. He successfully defended his title in 1985. His lengthy Grand Prix career spanned 18 seasons.

References

External links
 Wildeman-Zündapp

Swiss motorcycle racers
50cc World Championship riders
125cc World Championship riders
1948 births
Living people
80cc World Championship riders